If It Ain't Me may refer to:

 "If It Ain't Me" (Dua Lipa & Normani song), a 2021 song by Dua Lipa and Normani
 "If It Ain't Me" (Trina song), a 2017 song by Trina featuring K. Michelle